The United International Mansion Construction began in 1998. The building was then to measure 238 meters. Construction was suspended the following year, to resume in 2004, according to new plans; the tower was then to culminate at 289 m. It was again stopped in 2005, to finally restart in 2008, to end up with the current building. Is a late-modernist skyscraper made of reinforced concrete in Chongqing, China completed in 2013.

As of 2014, it has the 8th-highest Helipad in the world at 286 m (942 ft).

See also
List of tallest buildings in Chongqing
List of tallest buildings in China

References

2013 establishments in China
Office buildings completed in 2013
Skyscraper office buildings in Chongqing
Buildings and structures in Chongqing
Skyscrapers in Chongqing